The 2020 League of Ireland season was Bohemian Football Club's 130th year in their history and their 36th consecutive season in the League of Ireland Premier Division since it became the top tier of Irish football. Bohemians were due to participate in both national domestic cup competitions this season, namely the FAI Cup and the EA Sports Cup. The latter was deferred indefinitely due to the Coronavirus pandemic. Bohemians competed in the UEFA Europa League for the first time in seven years as they qualified with a third-place finish the previous season.

Bohs were drawn against arch-rivals Shamrock Rovers in an opening day Dublin Derby when fixtures for the 2020 season were released in late December 2019. They would go on to finish as Runners up in the Premier Division, securing European football for the second consecutive year. 

The club announced record-high sales for season tickets and memberships prior to the start of their league campaign. However, all football activity in the Republic of Ireland was halted in March due to the Coronavirus pandemic. The Football Association of Ireland announced a contingency plan with a view to completing the domestic season at a later date, with a reduced number of games. Matches after the restart were played without fans in attendance.

Club

Kits
Bohemians announced a new four-year partnership with Des Kelly Interiors as new main sponsors, beginning with the 2020 season. Manufactured by O'Neills, the red and black striped shirt features a special gold crest and has the club's name written in the Irish language. This is to mark the club's 130th anniversary and their 100th season in the League of Ireland.

On 12 February 2020 Bohemians announced a new away kit, a white jersey with diagonal red and black pinstripes. It includes a Refugees Welcome logo on the chest and is in conjunction with Amnesty International.

On 16 March 2020, Bohs launched a blue and navy striped third kit featuring a yellow trim. This kit also includes the commemorative inscriptions for the 130 year anniversary of the club. This kit was selected for use in Bohemians UEFA Europa League campaign.

Supplier: O'Neills / Sponsor: Des Kelly Interiors

Management team

Squad

†   Player out on loan

Transfers

In

Loan in

Out

Loan out

Friendlies

Pre-season

Mid-season

Competitions

Overview

{|class="wikitable" style="text-align:left"
|-
!rowspan=2 style="width:140px;"|Competition
!colspan=8|Record
|-
!style="width:40px;"|
!style="width:40px;"|
!style="width:40px;"|
!style="width:40px;"|
!style="width:40px;"|
!style="width:40px;"|
!style="width:40px;"|
!style="width:70px;"|
|-
|Premier Division

|-
|FAI Cup

|-
|Europa League

|-
!Total

League of Ireland

League table

Results summary

Results by matchday

Matches

FAI Cup

UEFA Europa League

Statistics

Appearances and goals
{| class="wikitable" style="text-align:center;width:85%;"
|-
! rowspan=2 style=background:#990000;color:#000000| No.
! rowspan=2 style=background:#990000;color:#000000| Pos.
! rowspan=2 style=background:#990000;color:#000000| Player
! colspan=2 style=background:#990000;color:#000000| Premier Division
! colspan=2 style=background:#990000;color:#000000| FAI Cup
! colspan=2 style=background:#990000;color:#000000| Europa League
! colspan=2 style=background:#990000;color:#000000| Total
|-
! style=background:#990000;color:#000000| Apps
! style=background:#990000;color:#000000| Goals
! style=background:#990000;color:#000000| Apps
! style=background:#990000;color:#000000| Goals
! style=background:#990000;color:#000000| Apps
! style=background:#990000;color:#000000| Goals
! style=background:#990000;color:#000000| Apps
! style=background:#990000;color:#000000| Goals
|-
| 1
| GK
|align=left|  James Talbot
||8||0||2||0||0||0||10||0
|-
| 2
| DF
|align=left|  Andy Lyons
||12||0||0||0||1||0||13||0
|-
| 3
| DF
|align=left|  Anthony Breslin
||14||1||0||0||1||0||15||1
|-
| 4
| DF
|align=left|  Dan Casey
||15||0||1||0||1||0||17||0
|-
| 5
| DF
|align=left|  Rob Cornwall
||13||0||1||0||1||0||15||0
|- 
| 7
| MF
|align=left|  Danny Mandroiu
||9(4)||3||0||0||1(1)||0||9(5)||3
|-
| 8 
| MF
|align=left|  JJ Lunney
||13 (3)||0||1||0||1||0||15 (3)||0
|-
| 9
| FW
|align=left|  Dinny Corcoran
||5 (5)||0||1||1||0||0||6 (5)||1
|-
| 10
| MF
|align=left|  Keith Ward
||14(6)||1||1(1)||0||1||1||16(7)||2
|-
| 12
| MF
|align=left|  Danny Grant
||16(3)||7||1||0||1||0||18(3)||7
|-
| 14
| MF
|align=left|  Conor Levingston
||10 (2)||0||2||0||1(1)||0||13(3)||0
|-
| 15
| FW
|align=left|  Andre Wright
||16(2)||8||1||1||1||0||18(3)||9
|-
| 16
| MF
|align=left|  Keith Buckley
||16||1||1||0||1||0||18||1
|-
| 18
| DF
|align=left|  James Finnerty
||5 (1)||0||1||0||1(1)||0||7(2)||0
|-
| 19
| FW
|align=left|  Glen McAuley
||5 (2)||0||1(1)||0||0||0||6(3)||0
|-
| 20
| FW
|align=left|  Evan Ferguson
||2(1)||0||1(1)||0||0||0||3(2)||0
|-
| 21
| MF
|align=left|  Jack Moylan
||2(2)||0||1(1)||0||0||0||3(3)||0
|-
| 22
| DF
|align=left|  Paddy Kirk
||4||0||2||0||0||0||6||0
|-
| 23
| DF
|align=left|  Michael Barker
||7 (2)||0||1||0||0||0||8 (2)||0
|-
| 25
| GK
|align=left|  Stephen McGuinness
||10||0||0||0||1||0||11||0
|-
| 26
| MF
|align=left|  Ross Tierney
||8 (7)||0||1(1)||0||0||0||9 (8)||0
|-
| 28
| MF
|align=left|  Dawson Devoy
||10 (5)||0||2||0||1(1)||0||13(6)||0
|-
| 29
| GK
|align=left|  Jamie Cleary
||0||0||0||0||0||0||0||0
|-
| 30
| MF
|align=left|  Promise Omochere
||5(1)||0||2||1||0||0||7(1)||1
|-
| -
| FW
|align=left|  Cristian Magerusan
||0||0||0||0||0||0||0||0
|-
|-
! colspan=15 style=background:#dcdcdc| Players left club during season
|-
|6
| DF
|align=left|  Ciaran Kelly
||2(1)||0||1||0||0||0||3(1)||0
|-
|11
| MF
|align=left|  Kris Twardek
||13||1||1||0||1||0||15||1
|-
|17
| MF
|align=left|  Callum Thompson
||0||0||0||0||0||0||0||0
|-
|27| MF
|align=left|  Luke Wade-Slater||3 (1)||0||1(1)||0||0||0||4(2)||0
|-
|}

Top scorers

 Hat tricks 

Clean sheets

Discipline

†   Player out on loan''

Captains 
{| class="wikitable" style="text-align:center;width:75%;"
|-
! style=background:#990000;color:#000000| No.
! style=background:#990000;color:#000000| Pos.
! style=background:#990000;color:#000000| Player
! style=background:#990000;color:#000000| No. Games
! style=background:#990000;color:#000000| Notes
|-
| 16
| MF
|  Keith Buckley
| 19
| Captain
|-
| 5
| DF
|  Robert Cornwall
| 1
|  Vice-Captain
|-
| 23
| DF
|  Michael Barker
| 1
|

International call-ups

Canada Under 23 National Team

Republic of Ireland Under 21 National Team

Awards

References

Bohemian F.C. seasons
2020 League of Ireland Premier Division by club